The Miniature Self-Defense Missile (MSDM) is a US Air Force concept for a weapon designed to take out anti-aircraft missiles. Lacking a warhead, it requires a direct impact to destroy its target. It was first announced in 2015 and is being developed by Raytheon with first fly test expected by 2023.

Similar projects 

 Hard Kill Self Protection Countermeasure System (HKSPCS) (US Navy)
 Hard Kill Defensive Aid System (HK-DAS) (MBDA)

References 

Post–Cold War air-to-air missiles of the United States